The Royal Science and Technology Park (RSTP) is a Swazi public enterprise and science park created to foster the conception of inventions and facilitate their patenting and help knit various elements of the R&D cluster together. It is intended to provide a focal point for research, facilitates the links between research and industrial communities and stimulates the development of knowledge-based businesses through the incubation of techno-preneurship and high-tech enterprises.

The Royal Science and Technology Park - SEZ

The Royal Science and Technology Park (RSTP) was designated as a Special Economic Zone through the Special Economic Zone Act of 2018. This was an initiative by His Majesty King Mswati III to attract foreign investment into the Kingdom of Eswatini, promote export-oriented growth, generate employment with the intention to ensure technology transfer to the Eswatini populace, subsequently boost economic growth. The Investor Management Services Unit is responsible for the operationalization and management of RSTP’s SEZ Industrial Plot and the One Stop Shop Service Centre (OSSSC). 

Masterplan: Location and Infrastructure Development

The RSTP SEZ, manages 317.7ha of land, which master plan comprise 159 ha for industrial development ideally located in close proximity to import and export transport routes; through the highway access to Republic of South Africa and the Republic of Mozambique, dry port railway line leading to Maputo Sea Port (Republic of Mozambique) and Richards Bay Sea Port (Republic of South Africa). Currently 80ha of the industrial development land at Nokwane is serviced and is readily available for the potential targeted investments to be situated. A Master Plan is in place for the development of the basic infrastructure for the remaining 79ha of the industrial development land on the Phocweni side of RSTP. Underway is the completion of a One Stop Shop/Service Centre which is intended to ease and expedite the administrative processes and procedures of doing business in the SEZ.

One Stop Shop Service Centre

The OSSSC is an infrastructure which is to house all the relevant stakeholders that provides all the services that an investor may require when locating their investment at the SEZ.
Services provided to investors through the One Stop Shop include:
 Company & Business Registration
 Trade and Business License Applications
 Income Tax and VAT registration
 Work Permits
 Entry visas
 Banking Services
 Connection of utilities e.g. power, telecommunications & water
 Provide specialist business advisory services.
 After Care Services

INCETIVES

Access to Markets:

Access to markets via The Kingdom of Eswatini Free Trade and Preferential Agreements:
 Southern African Development Community (SADC)
 Southern African Customs Union(SACU)
 Common Market for Eastern and Southern Africa (COMESA)
 SACU – EFTA (European Free Trade Area)
 SADC – EU ECONOMIC PARTNERSHIP AGREEMENT
 SACU-MERCOSUR PREFERENTIAL TRADE AGREEMENT
 African Growth and Opportunity Act(AGOA)

Fiscal and Tax:
 Exemption from corporate tax for an initial period of 20 years, thereafter a corporate tax shall be charged at a rate of 5%;
 Remissions of customs duty, Value added tax and any other tax payable in respect to goods purchased for use of raw material, equipment, machinery including all goods and services directly related to manufacturing in the zones;
 Be entitled to source-based taxation;
 Be entitled to an exemption from capital gains tax;
 Unlimited foreign exchange control
 Permitted to offshore financial services, for qualifying investors
 Be entitled to unrestricted repatriation of profits;
 Be entitled to an exemption from death duty;
Non-Fiscal:
 Be entitled to claim an allowance on constructed buildings;
 Be entitled to an allowance for research and development;
 Exemption from training levy, for an investor who has trained local employees;
 Be entitled to green technology allowance.

Royal Science & Technology Park Ecosystem:
 
Support Services Business Units can provide services that can be outsourced which would allow investors to focus on their core business and to reduce infrastructure and operational costs.
 National Data Centre      
 Advanced School of IT
 Special Economic Zone
 Business Incubator
 Biotechnology Research Facilities
 National Contact Centre

REQUIREMENTS

The initial capital investment for a sole proprietor is E30, 000,000 and E70, 000, 000 for joint ventures. An Enterprise or investor has to demonstrate their business case, the financial viability of theire investment, as well as the socioeconomic benefits of the proposed investment.
The Enterprise or investor intending to set up shall;
 Ensure decent employment for employees;
 Ensure that ninety percent (90%) of the employees are within the taxable bracket;
 Ensure that the minimum employment quota of Eswatini citizens is two thirds (2/3);
 Ensure that the localization policy is adhered to; and
 Ensure skills transfer

EARMARKED INVESTMENTS
 Information & Communications Technology (ICT)
 High- Tech Manufacturing
 Agro-processing
 Biotechnology
 Pharmaceutical
 Research and Development (R&D)
 Minerals

References

External links

Science parks in Eswatini